The Estonia women's national ice hockey team is the women's national ice hockey team of Estonia. The team is controlled by the Estonian Ice Hockey Association, a member of the International Ice Hockey Federation.

History
Estonia played its first game in 2005 in an exhibition game against Iceland, held in Tallinn, Estonia. Estonia won the game 8–2. The following year they competed at the Riga Tournament which was held in Valmiera, Latvia. Competing against Latvia, the Netherlands, and Norway, Estonia lost all three games with the 15–0 loss against Latvia being recorded as their worst ever result.

In 2007 Estonia competed at their first IIHF World Women's Championships. Placed in Division IV, they finished fourth, winning two of their five games. The following year Estonia competed at the 2008 IIHF Women's World Championship again winning two of their five games in Division IV.

After the Great Recession struck the world in 2008, the Estonian team halted activities, and would remain dormant until 2015, when former national team player Katrin Talvak gathered a group of players in Tallinn. In 2017, the Estonian Women's Hockey League was relaunched. The national team was due to return to competition at the 2021 IIHF Women's World Championship Division III, the lowest IIHF women's hockey tier, before the tournament was cancelled due to the COVID-19 pandemic. In December 2020, the team launched a documentary and fundraising project.

Tournament record

World Championship
2007 – 4th in Division IV (31st overall)
2008 – 4th in Division IV (31st overall)
2021 – Cancelled due to the COVID-19 pandemic
2022 – 1st in Division III B (35th overall)

Other tournaments
2006 Riga Tournament – 4th

All-time record against other nations

As of 14 September 2011

References

External links

IIHF profile
National Teams of Ice Hockey

Ice hockey
Women's national ice hockey teams in Europe